Cristhippopsis flavovittatus is a species of beetle in the family Cerambycidae, and the only species in the genus Cristhippopsis. It was described by Breuning in 1977.

References

Agapanthiini
Beetles described in 1977
Monotypic Cerambycidae genera
Taxa named by Stephan von Breuning (entomologist)